Muscat is a fairly common surname among people of Maltese descent. The following people have the surname Muscat:

Arts and entertainment
Angelo Muscat (1930–1977), Maltese actor
Brent Muscat (b. 1967), American rock guitarist
Emma Muscat (b. 1999), Maltese Singer and model
Mike Muscat (b. 1952), American actor

Politics
Joseph Muscat (b. 1974), former Prime Minister of Malta
Josie Muscat (b. 1943), Maltese politician

Sport
Alex Muscat (b. 1984), Maltese footballer
Charles Muscat (1963–2011), Maltese footballer
Kevin Muscat (b. 1973), Australian football coach
Manny Muscat (b. 1984), Maltese-Australian footballer
Mario Muscat (b. 1976), Maltese footballer
Nicola Muscat (b. 1994), Maltese swimmer
Richard Muscat (b. 1992), Australian motor-racing driver
Rowen Muscat (b. 1991), Maltese footballer
Zach Muscat (b. 1993), Maltese footballer

Other fields
John Nicholas Muscat (1735–c.1800), Maltese philosopher

See also
Ġużè Muscat Azzopardi (1853–1927), Maltese writer and lawyer
Muskat

Maltese-language surnames